Aline Lahoud (born 2 March 1986) is a Lebanese singer.

Life
Lahoud's parents are Salwa Al Katrib and producer Nahi Lahoud. She studied singing and dramatic art from 1997 until 1999. In 2002, she received a BA degree in Communication Arts, majoring in Screenplay and Directing Studies.

Career
After winning the international prize at the Megahit-International Mediterranean Song Contest in Turkey, Lahoud was selected by Télé Liban to represent  in the Eurovision Song Contest 2005, with the song "Quand tout s'enfuit".  However, Lebanon withdrew from the contest.

In 2014, Lahoud participated in the third season of The Voice: la plus belle voix broadcast on French TV channel TF1. However after the initial battle round, Lahoud was eliminated from the show.

References

External links

Aline Lahoud Official Website

Living people
1981 births
21st-century Lebanese women singers
The Voice (franchise) contestants
Musicians from Beirut
Lebanese Maronites
Lahoud family